The Zagreb Ladies Open is a tournament for professional female tennis players played on outdoor clay courts. It is classified as a $60,000 ITF Women's Circuit event and has been held in Zagreb, Croatia, since 2005. The tournament returned in 2018, having not being held since 2011.

Past finals

Singles

Doubles

External links
 ITF search

ITF Women's World Tennis Tour
Clay court tennis tournaments
Tennis tournaments in Croatia
Recurring sporting events established in 2005